Valdemarín is a ward (barrio) of Madrid belonging to the district of Moncloa-Aravaca. Its code number is 95 and, as of 2006, its population was of 4,000.

Geography
The ward is located in north-western area of the city, crossed by the M-40 orbital motorway and close to the borders of Moncloa-Aravaca with Fuencarral-El Pardo. Nearest barrios are Aravaca, in the south, and Ciudad Universitaria, in the east. Just in the north of Valdemarín, over the M-40, is situated a great city forest (16,000 ha) named Monte de El Pardo.

The principal road of the ward is Avenida de Valdemarín, running from east to west.

References

External links
 Valdemarín at WikiMadrid

Wards of Madrid
Moncloa-Aravaca